Edward J. Dengel (October 6, 1866 – December 9, 1943) was an American politician and businessman.

Born in Milwaukee, Wisconsin, Dengel was in the plumbing, roofing, and wholesale drug businesses. Dengel was involved in the Republican Party. Dengel served in the Wisconsin State Assembly. He died in Milwaukee, Wisconsin.

Notes

1866 births
1943 deaths
Politicians from Milwaukee
Businesspeople from Milwaukee
Republican Party members of the Wisconsin State Assembly